The Richmond Flyers were an ice hockey team who were founded in 1977 as the London Phoenix Flyers, changing their name to Richmond Flyers in 1980. They competed in the Inter-City League between 1980 and 1982, the British Hockey League between 1982 and 1989, and the English League between 1989 and 1991.

The club ceased to exist from 1992 when their home ice rink, Richmond Ice Rink, was demolished to make way for flats overlooking the River Thames.

References
London Phoenix Flyers entry on A to Z Encyclopaedia of Ice Hockey
Richmond Flyers entry on A to Z Encyclopaedia of Ice Hockey

Ice hockey teams in London
Defunct ice hockey teams in the United Kingdom
Ice hockey clubs established in 1977
Sports clubs disestablished in 1992